Rachecourt-sur-Marne (literally Rachecourt on Marne) is a commune in the Haute-Marne department in north-eastern France.

Population

See also
Communes of the Haute-Marne department

References

Rachecourtsurmarne